The Bali–Sasak–Sumbawa languages are a group of closely related languages spoken in the western Lesser Sunda Islands (Bali and West Nusa Tenggara). The three languages are Balinese on Bali, Sasak on Lombok, and Sumbawa on western Sumbawa.
Balinese
Sasak–Sumbawa
Sasak
Sumbawa

These languages have similarities with Javanese, which several classifications have taken as evidence of a relationship between them. However, the similarities are with the "high" registers (formal language/royal speech) of Balinese and Sasak; when the "low" registers (commoner speech) are considered, the connection appears instead to be with Madurese and Malay. (See Malayo-Sumbawan languages.)

The position of the Bali–Sasak–Sumbawa languages within the Malayo-Polynesian languages is unclear. Adelaar (2005) assigned them to a larger "Malayo-Sumbawan" subgroup,  but this proposal remains controversial.

References

 
Malayo-Polynesian languages
Lesser Sunda Islands
Balinese language